Takanyi Garanganga (born 6 September 1990) is a professional Zimbabwean tennis player.  He was born in Mbare, Zimbabwe, a suburb of Harare, and began playing tennis at the age of 8.

He first found success at the age of 14 playing tennis, winning the African Junior Championship at the age of 14. This success sparked the interest of Zimbabwean coach Brian de Villiers, who brought Garanganga to the United States. After a career on the junior circuit and graduating from high school at Keystone National High School in 2008, Garanganga turned down offers to play collegiate tennis at the University of Georgia and the University of Illinois to focus on a professional career.

Garanganga has represented Zimbabwe at Davis Cup, where he has a win–loss record of 21–21.

Career
Takanyi Garanganga has primarily spent his time on the Futures circuit, while also playing challengers some ATP World Tour qualifying tournaments.  He began playing on the tour in 2008, competing in tournaments in the United States and Africa.  He has also represented Zimbabwe in Davis Cup action.

His most notable tournament success was winning the gold medal at the 2011 All-Africa Games in Maputo, Mozambique for Men's Singles.

Future and Challenger finals

Singles: 20 (9–11)

Doubles 3 (2–1)

References

External links
 
 
 
 
 

1990 births
Living people
Shona people
Sportspeople from Harare
Zimbabwean male tennis players
African Games medalists in tennis
African Games gold medalists for Zimbabwe
African Games bronze medalists for Zimbabwe
Competitors at the 2011 All-Africa Games
Competitors at the 2019 African Games